The ESPN Events Invitational (previously the Orlando Invitational, Orlando Classic, Old Spice Classic, and Advocare Invitational) is an annual college basketball tournament played over Thanksgiving weekend, Thursday, Friday, and Sunday.  The inaugural tournament was held November, 23, 24, and 26, 2006. The tournament is played at the State Farm Field House at ESPN Wide World of Sports Complex in the Walt Disney World Resort near Orlando, Florida.  In the current format, the tournament consists of eight teams from separate conferences.  All eight teams are guaranteed three games. Teams who lose in the first round move to the consolation bracket and can finish no better than 5th, while the worst a team can finish that wins in the first round is 4th. The final ranking of the teams is determined by separate games for 1st, 3rd, 5th, and 7th place.  The Metro Atlantic Athletic Conference serves as the host for the tournament. The 2020 tournament was cancelled because of the COVID-19 pandemic.

Standings history

Brackets 
* – Denotes overtime period

2022 
November 24–November 27

2021 

November 25–November 28

2019 
 

November 28–December 1

2018 

November 22–November 25

2017 
 
November 23–November 26

2016 
 

November 24–November 27

2015 
 

November 26–November 29

2014 

November 27–November 30

2013 

November 28–December 1

2012 

November 24–27

2011 

November 24–27

2010 

November 25–28

2009 

November 26–27, 29

2008 

November 27–28, 30

2007 

November 22–23, 25

2006 

November 23–24, 26

References

External links
 Official website

2006 establishments in Florida
21st century in Orlando, Florida
Basketball competitions in Orlando, Florida
College men's basketball competitions in the United States
College basketball competitions
Recurring sporting events established in 2006
Thanksgiving (United States)
Events at Walt Disney World